Seoul Metropolitan City Route 51 is an urban road located in Seoul, South Korea.

Stopovers
 Seoul
 Seocho District - Gangnam District - Seongdong District - Dongdaemun District - Seongbuk District - Gangbuk District - Dobong District

List of Facilities 

IS: Intersection, IC: Interchange
 (■): Motorway section

References

Roads in Seoul